Seamus Tansey, also spelled Séamus Tansey, was an Irish flute player born in Gorteen, County Sligo, Ireland in 1943. He won the All-Ireland flute title in 1965. Seamus Tansey died on July 9th, 2022.

Discography

Various artists. The Breeze From Erin. Topic 12T184.
Seamus Tansey with Eddie Corcoran. Seamus Tansey. Leader LEA 005, 1970. Seamus Tansey: flute, whistle, tambourine. Eddie Corcoran: whistle, tambourine. Reg Hall: piano. Paul Gross: piano. Contents: Jackie Coleman's No 1 / No 2; The Morning Dew; Boys of Laoise; Miss Monaghan; Colonel Frazer / Miss McLeod's; O'Rourke's / The Wild Irishman; The Bloom of Youth / Lord MacDonald's; The Steam Packet / The Limestone Rock; Pigeon on the Gate / The Reel of Mullinavat.  Jigs: Tansey's Favourite / The Bride's Favourite; The Maid of St Kisco / Tom Ward's Downfall; Farewell to Gurteen / Kid on the Mountain; The Cliffs of Moher / Paddy Fahy's; The Battering Ram; Corcoran's Fancy.  Hornpipes: Birmingham / Leitrim Fancy.
 Later reissued as Leader LEA 2005, 1970. Recorded in Croydon, 11 October 1967. "Record first produced 1970."
 Seamus Tansey. Séamus Tansey – Traditional Irish Music. Outlet SOLP 1007. Seamus Tansey, flute. Josephine Keegan, piano. Sean McGuire, music director.
 One track, "Sean McKenna's Reels," was included in the compilation The Champions. 9 Outlet champions play 16 of their best tracks of Irish traditional music, Outlet SOLP 1023, 1974.
 Reissued by Outlet Records, sometimes as Séamus Tansey – Traditional Irish Music or The Best of Seamus Tansey. Traditional Irish Flute, for example PTI CD 1007, undated.
 Reissued as the first disc, titled "Seamus Tansey," in the 10-disc set Celtic Souls, Irish Celtic Ballads & Traditional Music by Irish Music Licensing, undated. See a corrected contents listing at irishtune.info.
Coleman Country Traditional Society. Music from the Coleman Country. Leader LEA 2044, 1972.
Traditional music from Sligo. Outlet SOLP 1022, 1973. Seamus Tansey, flute. Josie Sheridan, accordion. Bernadette Sheridan, bodhran. Bernadette Grehan, 12 string guitar. Contents: Pipe on the hob—Leitrim jig—The road to Boyle—The happy couple—Michael Coleman's waltz—Mrs. Kinney's waltz—Across the Shannon—Mist in the glen—Grehan's reel—The movin' bogs—The blackbird—Lord Mayo—The long note—The groves of Erin—The fox hunter—The hills of Kesh—A walk in the country—Frieze britches—Lark in the morning—Port na Bpucai—Si bheag si—Sonny's mazurka—The hills of Clogher.
Seamus Tansey. King of the Concert Flute. Silver Hill PSH 108, 1976. Séamus Tansey, flute. Charlie Lennon, piano. Contents: Boy's of the Lough—Devils of Dublin—Jim Coleman's reels—Jim Donoghues jigs—Martin Wynne's no. 1, no. 2 -- Gold ring—Frost is all over—Lament for the battle of Aughrim—Morrisson's -- Galway rambler—McCann's -- Old grey goose—Major Harrison's feodora—West wind—Michael Coleman's jig—Up sligo—Dear Irish boy—Maid behind the barrel—Haymaker.
 Re-released, perhaps in the late 1990s, as: Seamus Tansey, King of the Concert Flute. Remastered, Sound Records, SUN CD49, no date. See a corrected contents listing at irishtune.info.
Various artists. Rosin the Bow. XTRA1171, 1976.
Seamus Tansey Jigs Reels and Airs. GTD HSMCD 028020, 1981. Distributed by Tradireland www.tradireland.ie
Seamus Tansey. Easter Snow. Temple COMD2063, 1997. See a corrected contents listing at irishtune.info.
Seamus Tansey and Jim McKillop. To Hell with the Begrudgers. 1998.
Seamus Tansey. Words and Music. Tanbar Recordings, 2001.

In 2009 Paddy Ryan's Dream/Mamma's Pet from The Breeze From Erin recorded with Reg Hall was included in Topic Records 70 year anniversary boxed set Three Score and Ten as track six on the third CD.

References

External links
 Geoff Wallis's review of Tansey's "Words and Music" CD
 Sean Laffey's article in FolkWorld

Irish folk musicians
Irish flautists
Living people
Year of birth missing (living people)